Buddha and the Chocolate Box is the eighth studio album by Cat Stevens. The title came to Stevens when he was travelling to a gig on a plane with a Buddha in one hand and a box of chocolates in the other. He pondered that if he were to die in the plane, these would be the last objects with him, and he would be caught between the spiritual and the material worlds. The album leans towards the spiritual path and is an indication of the direction his life would follow.

The single "Ready" reached number 20 in Canada.

Track listing
All tracks composed by Cat Stevens
Side one
 "Music" – 4:21
 "Oh Very Young" – 2:36
 "Sun / C79" – 4:35
 "Ghost Town" – 3:10
 "Jesus" – 2:14
Side two
  "Ready" – 3:18
 "King of Trees" – 5:07
 "A Bad Penny" – 3:21
 "Home in the Sky" – 3:38

Personnel
 Cat Stevens – vocals, synthesizer, guitar, keyboards, production, design, concept, illustrations
 Alun Davies – acoustic guitar, vocals
 Bruce Lynch – bass guitar
 Jean Roussel – strings, arrangements, keyboards, string arrangements
 Gerry Conway – drums, vocals, percussion

Additional personnel
 Jimmy Ryan – guitar
 Mark Warner – guitar
 Roland Harker – banjo
 Joanne – vocals, choir
 Judy – vocals, choir
 Sunny – vocals, choir
 Ruby – vocals
 Barry – vocals
 Joy – vocals
 Brigette – vocals, choir
 Suzanne – vocals, solo
 Jacqui – vocals, choir
 Clifford – vocals, choir
 Danny – vocals
 Rick – vocals
 Jimmy – vocals, choir, chorus
 Larry – vocals
 Del Newman – strings, arrangements, string arrangements
 Suzanne Cox – vocals

Production
 Paul Samwell-Smith – producer
 John Wood  – engineer
 Victor Gamm – engineer, mixing
 Alan Harris – mixing
 Ted Jensen – mastering
 Robin Black – mixing
 Roger Quested – mixing
 Beth Stempel – reissue co-ordination
 Bill Levenson – reissue supervisor
 Vartan – art direction
 Roland Young – design, concept
 Mathieu Bitton – package design, reissue package design

Charts

Weekly charts

Year-end charts

Certifications

References

1974 albums
Cat Stevens albums
Albums produced by Paul Samwell-Smith
Island Records albums
A&M Records albums
Albums recorded at Morgan Sound Studios
Buddhism in music